Lexington School District 4 is a school district in Lexington County, South Carolina, United States, serving the communities of Gaston, South Carolina and Swansea, South Carolina. The district serves 3K-Grade 12.

District employees:
 Dr. Robert Maddox-Superintendent
 Dr. Justin Nutter-Associate Superintendent

Schools:
 Early Childhood Center: 3K-5K
 Sandhills Primary: Grade 1-Grade 2
 Sandhills Elementary: Grade 3-Grade 4
 Frances F. Mack Intermediate: Grade 5-Grade  6
 Sandhills Middle: Grade 7-Grade 8
 Swansea High Freshmen Academy: Grade 9
 Swansea High School: Grade 10-Grade 12

School districts in South Carolina